Somatochlora shanxiensis is a species of dragonfly in the family Corduliidae. It is a metallic green to black dragonfly with yellow spots and a total length of 51 to 53 mm. It was described in 1999 based on specimens from Shanxi, China, and has also been recorded in Hubei. It is most similar to Somatochlora graeseri and Somatochlora uchidai.

References

Corduliidae
Odonata of Asia
Insects of China
Endemic fauna of China
Insects described in 1999